Julius H. Dennhardt (February 5, 1869 – March 19, 1929) was an American auctioneer, businessman, and politician.

Born in Naumberg, Saxony in what is now Germany, Dennhardt emigrated to the United States and settled in Wisconsin as a young man. He was in the implement business and was an auctioneer. Dennhardt served in the Wisconsin State Assembly in 1911 and was a Republican. He then served in the Wisconsin State Senate in 1919. In 1922, Dennhardt served as mayor of Neenah, Wisconsin. Dennhardt died of a stroke in Neenah, Wisconsin.

Notes

1869 births
1929 deaths
German emigrants to the United States
Politicians from Neenah, Wisconsin
Businesspeople from Wisconsin
Mayors of places in Wisconsin
Republican Party members of the Wisconsin State Assembly
Republican Party Wisconsin state senators